Christian Steger (born August 15, 1967 in Aosta) is an Italian skeleton racer who competed from the late 1990s to 2002. He finished 19th in the men's skeleton event at the 2002 Winter Olympics in Salt Lake City.

Steger's best finish at the FIBT World Championships was 21st at Calgary in 2001. He retired after the 2002 games.

References
2002 men's skeleton results
Skeletonsport.com profile

Italian male skeleton racers
1967 births
Living people
Skeleton racers at the 2002 Winter Olympics
Olympic skeleton racers of Italy
Sportspeople from Bruneck